The list below consists of the reasons delivered from the bench by the Supreme Court of Canada during 1991. This list, however, does not include decisions on motions.

Reasons

References
 1991 decisions: CanLII 

Reasons Of The Supreme Court Of Canada, 1991
Supreme Court of Canada reasons by year